Hidden Vagenda is the fourth solo album by American singer-songwriter Kimya Dawson, and the first to be released by K Records. The album contains songs about her pain from the deaths of loved ones, the then-upcoming 2004 election, and a power ballad version of a song from a previous solo album featuring a recording of members of The Moldy Peaches as an intro. Hidden Vagenda also includes myriad guest performers, including Daniel Johnston, Paleface, Vanessa Carlton, and members of the French anti-folk group Herman Düne.

The tracks "It's Been Raining" and "Blue Like Nevermind" were recorded in France with members of Herman Düne backing Kimya, and others were recorded in the Dawson family kitchen and Olive Juice Music in New York City.

A video for the song "Lullaby for the Taken" was directed by Ted Passon in 2004.

Track listing
 "It's Been Raining"
 "Fire" (featuring Regina Spektor - vocals)
 "Viva la Persistence"
 "Lullaby for the Taken"
 "I Will Never Forget"
 "Singing Machine"
 "Moving On" (featuring Regina Spektor - piano and Vanessa Carlton - backing vocals)
 "Blue Like Nevermind"
 "My Heroes"
 "Parade"
 "5 Years"
 "Anthrax" (powerballad version)
 "You Love Me"
 "Angels and Seagulls"

References

External links
 "Lullaby For The Taken" on YouTube
 [ Allmusic entry]

Kimya Dawson albums
K Records albums
2004 albums